Simon Lauru (born 30 January 1972 in Vanuatu)  is a player who plays for the Vanuatu national football team. His most famous goal was when he was playing against Papua New Guinea national football team, in the qualification group 2 to advance to the 2006 FIFA World Cup finals. He scored in the 91st minute of the game to draw the game 1-1, after Mauri Wasi scored for Papua New Guinea in the 73rd minute.

External links

1972 births
Living people
Vanuatuan footballers
Vanuatu international footballers
Association football midfielders
2000 OFC Nations Cup players
2002 OFC Nations Cup players
2004 OFC Nations Cup players